Nakhon Pa Mak is a rural subdistrict (tambon) in the Bang Krathum District of Phitsanulok Province, Thailand.

Etymology
The first element nakhon (Thai: นคร) means 'town' or 'city'.  The second element pa (Thai: ป่า) means 'forest'.  The third element mak (Thai: หมาก) means 'betel palm'.  The name as a whole would be loosely translated as 'betel palm forest city'. Betel palms are indigenous to the area and inhabitants chew on the betel nuts which contain a natural stimulant, much like chewing tobacco.

Geography
Nakhon Pa Mak primarily consists of flat lowlands in the Nan Basin, which is part of the Chao Phraya Watershed. The Wang Thong River flows through Nakhon Pa Mak at the villages of Ban Sam Ruen and Bang Kranoi.  Nakhon Pa Mak borders Tha Tan to the north-west, Mae Raka of Wang Thong District to the north-east, Wat Ta Yom to the east, Phai Lom to the south, and Bang Krathum to the west.

History
Originally named Sam Ruean (สามเรือน), it was renamed to Nakhon Pa Mak in 1939.

Administration
The subdistrict is divided into 13 smaller divisions called (muban), which roughly correspond to the villages within Nakhon Pa Mak. There are eight villages, several of which occupy more than one muban. Nakhon Pa Mak is administered by a Tambon administrative organization (TAO). The muban in Nakhon Pa Mak are enumerated as follows:

Education
Nakhon Pa Mak has four elementary schools (Bueng Lam School, Wat Rat Samosom School, Wat Grung See Jayrin School and Wat Laemphrathat School).  Wat Rat Samoson School in Ban Sam Ruen was strictly an elementary school until around 1990, when an additional high school building was added. Prior to 1990, Nakhon Pa Mak children who wished to attend high school were required to utilize private transportation to the nearest high school in Ban Bang Krathum. There are no other high schools and no colleges or universities in Nakhon Pa Mak. There is also no school bus service.

Settlements
From most populated to least, the villages of Nakhon Pa Mak are:  Ban Grong Greng (pop. 1881), Ban Sam Ruen (pop. 1340), Ban Bueng Lam (pop. 1050), Ban Dongphayom (pop. 678), Bang Kranoi (pop. 567), Ban Laemphrathat (pop. 565), Ban Gao (pop. 299) and Ban Laemkrok (pop. 209).  From greatest land area to least, the villages rank as follows:  Ban Grong Greng (20.9 km2), Ban Laemphrathat (10.4 km2), Ban Dongphayom (6.2 km2), Ban Bueng Lam (5.9 km2), Ban Sam Ruen (5.4 km2), Ban Bang Kranoi (4.4 km2), Ban Gao (2.8 km2) and Ban Laemkrok (1.8 km2).

Temples
A complete list of active temples in Nakhon Pa Mak is as follows:
Wat Bunglam in Ban Bueng Lam is used primarily for funeral ceremonies.
Wat Grung See Jayrin (has a historic chedi)
Wat Laemphrathat
Wat Rat Samosom
Wat See Bun Mayiga Ram (Thai:  วัดศรีบุญมายิการาม, Temple of the Renowned Merit of the Noble Lady) in Ban Laemkrok
Wat Dongphayom
All of the temples in Nakhon Pa Mak are of the Theravada Buddhist denomination.

Attractions
Wat Grung See Jayrin
Ban Dongphayom Boat Race

References

Tambon of Phitsanulok province
Populated places in Phitsanulok province